Needles (April 29, 1953 – October 15, 1984) was an American Hall of Fame Champion Thoroughbred racehorse. In 1956, he became the first Florida-bred horse to win the Kentucky Derby; that year he also won the Belmont Stakes.

Background
Needles was a bay colt bred and raised in Ocala, Florida. He was the descendant of Blenheim and a son and grandson of Kentucky Derby winners Ponder and Pensive. Needles was a sickly foal who was given his name because of the numerous veterinary injections he was given to overcome broken ribs and pneumonia. Needles' dam Noodle Soup was a descendant of the influential Irish broodmare Golden Harp.

Racing career
Owned by Jack Dudley and Bonnie Heath who raced as the D & H Stable, at age two Needles won six of ten starts, including the prestigious Hopeful Stakes. His performances that year earned him the 1955 championship as two-year-old colt.

Ridden by David Erb, Needles was a crowd favorite for his come-from-behind style, sometimes overcoming a 15-length deficit. The betting favorite, Needles won the 1956 Kentucky Derby by coming from 16th place in a field of 17 to make up 24 lengths and win "going away". His victory marked the first time a Florida-bred horse won America's most prestigious horse race.

In the Preakness Stakes, the next leg of the U.S. Triple Crown races at Pimlico Race Course, Needles finished second to the Calumet Farm colt Fabius, whom he had beaten in the Derby. Needles came back in New York to win the grueling one and a half-mile Belmont Stakes, the final and longest leg of the Triple Crown races. Career Boy finished second and  Fabius ran third. Needles earned another championship as three-year-old colt in 1956.

At age four, Needles started three times, finishing 1, 2, and 3. His 1957 racing season ended early following an injury.

Stud record
Needles was sent to stand at stud at owner Bonnie Heath's breeding farm in Marion County, Florida. Needles' success in racing sparked a boom in Florida horse breeding. Among others, it produced notable runners such as Carry Back and Affirmed.

Needles died in 1984 at the age of 31. His heart and hooves are buried in the Garden of Champions at the Ocala Breeders' Sales Company Pavilion. In 2000, he was inducted into the United States National Museum of Racing and Hall of Fame.

Pedigree

See also
 List of historical horses

References

1953 racehorse births
1984 racehorse deaths
Racehorses bred in Florida
Racehorses trained in the United States
Kentucky Derby winners
Belmont Stakes winners
American Champion racehorses
United States Thoroughbred Racing Hall of Fame inductees
Thoroughbred family 5-e